George H. Littlefield (May 2, 1842 – December 25, 1919) was a corporal in the Union Army and a Medal of Honor recipient for his actions in the American Civil War.

Medal of Honor citation
Rank and organization: Corporal, Company G, 1st Maine Veteran Infantry. Place and date: At Fort Fisher, Va., March 25, 1865. Entered service at: Skowhegan, Maine. Birth: Skowhegan, Maine. Date of issue: June 22, 1885.

Citation:

The color Corporal having been wounded, this soldier picked up the flag and bore it to the front, to the great encouragement of the charging column.

See also

List of Medal of Honor recipients
List of American Civil War Medal of Honor recipients: G–L

References

External links

United States Army Medal of Honor recipients
United States Army soldiers
People from Skowhegan, Maine
People of Maine in the American Civil War
1842 births
1919 deaths
American Civil War recipients of the Medal of Honor